Castelpizzuto is a comune (municipality) in the Province of Isernia in the Italian region Molise, located about  west of Campobasso and about  southeast of Isernia.

Castelpizzuto borders the following municipalities: Castelpetroso, Longano, Pettoranello del Molise, Roccamandolfi, Santa Maria del Molise.

Demographic evolution

References

Cities and towns in Molise